Stephen T. Johnson (born 1950) is a retired major general in the United States Marine Corps who served as commanding general of the 2nd Marine Division during the Iraq War.

He is an alumnus of Monmouth College.

References

1950 births
Living people
Monmouth College alumni
United States Marine Corps generals